This is a list of flag bearers who have represented Botswana at the Olympics.

Flag bearers carry the national flag of their country at the opening ceremony of the Olympic Games.

See also
Botswana at the Olympics

References

Botswana at the Olympics
Botswana
Olympic